Bhubaneswar is the capital of the Indian state of Odisha. The city has a long history of over 2000 years starting with Chhedi dynasty (around 2nd century BCE) who had Sisupalgarh near present-day Bhubaneswar as their capital. Historically Bhubaneswar has been known by different names such as Toshali, Kalinga Nagari, Nagar Kalinga, Ekamra Kanan, Ekamra Kshetra and Mandira Malini Nagari (City of Temples) otherwise known as the Temple City of India. Bhubaneswar, literally means the Lord (Eeswar) of the Universe (Bhuban). It is the largest city of Orissa, and a center of economic & religious importance in the region today.

Bhubaneswar's proud possession of magnificent sculptures and architectural heritage, coupled with the sanctity as Ekamrakshetra make this one of the great religious centres of Orissa since early medieval days. With its large number of Hindu temples (over 600 in number), which span the entire spectrum of Kalinga architecture, Bhubaneswar is often referred to as a Temple City of India and together with Puri and Konark it forms the Swarna Tribhuja (Golden Triangle); one of the most visited destinations in East India.

The modern city of Bhubaneswar was designed by the German architect Otto Königsberger in 1946. Like Jamshedpur, Chandigarh, it is one of the first planned cities of modern India. With the Chandaka reserve forest on the fringes, the city with an abundance of in-city greenery and an efficient civic body (the BMC- Bhubaneswar Municipal Corporation), is one of the cleanest and greenest cities of India.

Bhubaneswar replaced Cuttack as the political capital of the state of Orissa in 1948, a year after India gained its independence from Britain. Bhubaneswar and Cuttack are often commonly together known as the twin-cities of Orissa. The metropolitan area formed by the twin cities has a 2011 population of 1.4 million. Bhubaneswar is categorized as a Tier-2 city. An emerging Information Technology (IT) hub, the boom in the metals and metal processing industries have made Bhubaneswar one of the fastest developing cities of India in recent years.

The city of Bhubaneswar can be broadly divided into following parts- the old town area, the planned city, the added areas and  the Greater Bhubaneswar area. The neighbourhoods in Bhubaneswar can also be divided according to the geographical location of the place.

North Bhubaneswar
The northern Bhubaneswar roughly constitute the areas lying north of National Highway 5 till Barang. Most of these areas have developed later and not the part of the original master plan of the city made in 1948.
 Chandrasekharpur
 Damana
 Infocity
 Sailashree Vihar
 Niladri Vihar
 Rail Vihar
 Nalco Nagar
 Gajapati Nagar
 Vani Vihar
 Salia Sahi
 Jaydev Vihar
 IRC  Village
 Patia

Near by Villagess
 Barimund
 Raghunathpur
 Tangibanta 
 Jaripatna
 Kalarahanga
 Injana
 Singada
 Rokat
 Kalajhari
 Barang
 Patharagadia
 Chandaka
 Andharua

Central Bhubaneswar
 A G Colony
 Acharya Vihar
 Ashok Nagar
 Bapuji Nagar
 Bhauma Nagar
 Bhoi Nagar
 Ekamra Vihar
 Forest Park
 Ganga Nagar
 Keshari Nagar
 Kharavella Nagar
 Madhusudan Nagar
 Master Canteen
 Nayapalli
 Saheed Nagar
 Satya Nagar
 Surya Nagar
 Unit - 1
 Unit - 2
 Unit - 3
 Unit - 4
 Unit - 5
 Unit - 6
 Unit - 7
 Unit - 8

South Bhubaneswar
 Samantarapur
 BJB Nagar
 Rajarani Colony
 Pandav Nagar
 Brahmeswar Bagh
 Lingaraj Nagar
 Gouri Nagar
 Bhimatangi
 Kapileswar
 Old Town
 Uttara

Western Bhubaneswar
A relatively new part of Bhubaneswar constituting both planned, unplanned colonies and Villages. The western fringe areas are growing at a rapid phase, due to real estate boom and establishment of educational institutions.

 Baramunda
 Gopabandhu Nagar
 Delta Colony
 Surya Nagar
 CRPF
 Jagamara
 Khandagiri

Fringes
 Gandamunda
 Pokhariput
 Palaspali
 Bhimatangi
 Dumduma
 Sundarpada
 Balabhadrapur (Sundarpada-Jatani Road)
 Kantilo (Sundarpada-Jatani Road)
 Ebaranga (Sundarpada-Jatani Road)
 Patrapada
 Udayagiri Vihar (On the Northern outside area of Patrapada)
 Tamando
 Kalinga Nagar
 Ghatikia
 Janla

Eastern fringes
 Mancheswar
 VSS Nagar
 Rasulgarh
 Palasuni
 Satya Vihar 
 Jharpada
 Laxmisagar
 Chintamanishwar
 BJB Nagar
 Canal Road
 Pandra
near by 
 saptasati temple
 naharkanta

References

Bhubaneswar-related lists
 
Bhubaneswar